The Caranchos of Florida (Spanish:Los Caranchos de la Florida) is a novel by the Argentine writer Benito Lynch, which was first published in 1916. The title refers to the crested caracara, a bird of prey known in Spanish as "Caranchos", and used as a pejorative similar to the English "vulture". The Florida in the title refers to a cattle ranch in rural Argentina, rather than the American state of the same name. It is part of the Gaucho literature genre.

In 1938 it was adapted into a film of the same title.

References

Bibliography
 Williams, Raymond Leslie. The Twentieth-Century Spanish American Novel. University of Texas Press, 2009.

1916 Argentine novels
Novels by Benito Lynch
Argentine novels adapted into films
Novels set in Argentina